Ramón Bautista Mestre (August 21, 1937 – March 6, 2003), an Argentine politician, was Governor of Córdoba from July 12, 1995 to July 12, 1999. He also served as Federal Interventor of Corrientes Province (December 16, 1999 to March 20, 2001), Minister of the Interior (from March 20, 2001 to December 21, 2001), and Mayor of the City of Córdoba (from December 1983 to December 1991).

Biography
Mestre was born in San Juan, Argentina. He enrolled at the National University of Córdoba School of Dentistry, and was elected President of the Student Union Organization. A member of the centrist Radical Civic Union (Unión Cívica Radical, or UCR) and protégé of Córdoba Governor Justo Páez Molina, Mestre began his political career as Deputy Health Secretary (1964) for Governor Páez Molina, and later as the Governor’s Chief of Staff (1965). Following the 1966 military coup d'état that overthrew President Arturo Illia, as well as Paez Molina and all other governors, he worked as a dentist in the private field. He married the former Cristina Sueldo, and they had four children. was elected to the Argentine Chamber of Deputies for Córdoba Province in 1973, and became leader of the UCR caucus until the March 1976 coup.

Career 

In 1983, he was elected Mayor of Córdoba for the 1983–87 period, and was reelected for a new period from 1987 to 1991. His administration completed numerous public works, notably the restoration of the Suquía River shore along the city. He then created his own organization in the UCR, Participación y Renovación, to challenge Eduardo Angeloz in the latter's 1991 bid for a third term as governor. Mestre lost the primaries; but he established a name as a natural candidate for the 1995 elections.

In 1994, he was elected to the National Convention that would approve extensive Constitutional amendments. In 1995, he was elected Governor of Córdoba. During his brief tenure, Mestre advanced a regional alliance with the governors of Entre Ríos and Santa Fe Provinces that became the "Center Region." Mestre hoped to accelerate growth in Córdoba; but the province struggled under the nation's economic downturn, and added to suspicions of corruption among Mestre appointees, the high fiscal deficit, as well as his own, unaccommodating style of governing, his administration quickly became unpopular.  He failed to win reelection in 1999, and the Justicialist Party won the Córdoba governorship for the first time, electing José Manuel De la Sota as the 56th Governor.

In 1999 until 2001, Mestre served as Federal Interventor in Corrientes Province, and was appointed Minister of the Interior during 2001. As the Interior Ministry oversaw law enforcement at the time, Mestre bore much of the responsibility in the repression of demonstrators at the Plaza de Mayo during the December 2001 riots that resulted in several deaths, and precipitated the fall of the President Fernando de la Rúa.

Death 

Mestre announced his candidacy for Governor of Córdoba, but died in 2003, as a result of hepatitis.

External links
Ramón Bautista Mestre Foundation

References

1937 births
2003 deaths
People from San Juan Province, Argentina
Argentine dentists
Governors of Córdoba Province, Argentina
National University of Córdoba alumni
Mayors of Córdoba, Argentina
Members of the Argentine Chamber of Deputies elected in Córdoba
Radical Civic Union politicians
Deaths from hepatitis
20th-century dentists
Ministers of Internal Affairs of Argentina